Jamie Husgen (born October 13, 1964) is a retired American professional ice hockey player. He was selected by the Winnipeg Jets in the 12th round (229th overall) of the 1983 NHL Entry Draft.

On February 9, 1989, the Winnipeg Jets traded Husgen to the Vancouver Canucks in exchange for future considerations. The Canucks then assigned Husgen to play for the Milwaukee Admirals of the International Hockey League.

References

External links

1964 births
Living people
Milwaukee Admirals players
Moncton Hawks players
Sherbrooke Canadiens players
Winnipeg Jets (1979–1996) draft picks
Ice hockey people from Missouri
American men's ice hockey defensemen